Toy Home is a downloadable racing video game on the PlayStation Store.

Gameplay
The goal of the game is to simply collect coins, discover hidden medals, and pass every checkpoint, earning 10 seconds each checkpoint, before times runs out. The player also win points by jumping, smashing and flipping in the room. There are 8 racetracks in the game, all of them are taking place in one of the rooms of the house and are filled with obstacles. After the singleplayer, there's a multiplayer mode, where up to 8 players can battle online, and leaderboards, where players can see their high scores. For the control scheme, the game makes use of Sixaxis for steering and for drifting, but it is also known to support DualShock 3 rumble controllers.

External links
 Toy Home official webpage

2007 video games
Game Republic games
PlayStation 3-only games
PlayStation Network games
Racing video games
Sony Interactive Entertainment games
PlayStation 3 games
Video games about toys
Video games developed in Japan
Multiplayer and single-player video games